Once in a Lifetime (original title: Les Héritiers) is a 2014 French drama film directed by Marie-Castille Mention-Schaar.

Plot
Based on a true story, the film chronicles the relationship of a teacher with teenagers who have long since dropped out of the school system. This teacher of Leon Blum high school at Créteil (Val-de-Marne), decides to enter a national competition titled "Children and adolescents in the Nazi concentration camp system". Initially tumultuous and frustrating, the atmosphere quickly evolves as they meet with a survivor of the camps and increasing intensity during a visit to a museum dedicated to this period of history. This experience will change their lives.

Cast

 Ariane Ascaride as Anne Gueguen
 Ahmed Dramé as Malik
 Noémie Merlant as Mélanie
 Geneviève Mnich as Yvette
 Stéphane Bak as Max
 Wendy Nieto as Jamila
 Aïmen Derriachi as Saïd
 Mohamed Seddiki as Olivier
 Naomi Amarger as Julie
 Alicia Dadoun as Camélia
 Adrien Hurdubae as Théo
 Raky Sall as Koudjiji
 Amine Lansari as Rudy
 Koro Dramé as Léa
 Xavier Maly as the principal

Reception
Karen Schollemann called the film on kinocritics.com a "powerful tale about integration".

Accolades

References

External links

2014 films
2010s French-language films
2014 drama films
French drama films
Films about education
Drama films based on actual events
Films directed by Marie-Castille Mention-Schaar
2010s French films